Anadolu (L-400) is an amphibious assault ship of the Turkish Navy that can be configured as a V/STOL aircraft carrier. It is named after the peninsula of Anatolia (Turkish: Anadolu) which forms the majority of the land mass of Turkey. The construction works began on 30 April 2016 at the shipyard of Sedef Shipbuilding Inc. in Istanbul, with the keel being laid on 7 February 2018, and is expected to be commissioned in 2022. The vessel is intended to meet the various needs and requirements of the Turkish Armed Forces, such as sustaining long-endurance, long-distance military combat or humanitarian relief operations; while acting as a command center and flagship for the Turkish Navy.

The Sedef–Navantia consortium won the tender for the amphibious assault ship project of the Turkish Navy and Anadolu will use the same design as that of the Spanish ship . All of the ship's weapons system will be procured by Turkish firms Aselsan and Havelsan. The ship will feature a Turkish combat management system, namely the GENESIS-ADVENT, which will be integrated by Aselsan and Havelsan. Aircraft landing is assisted in all weather condition by Leonardo SPN-720 Precision Approach Radar.

Navantia will provide design, technology transfer, equipment and technical assistance to Sedef Shipyard of Turkey for the design and development of Anadolu.

History

Design and specifications

In December 2013, the Turkish LPD/LHD program was originally estimated to cost €375 million ($500 million). According to the original plan, the Turkish Navy wanted a slightly shorter flight deck without the ski-jump ramp in front, to be optimized for use with only helicopters.

However, the Turkish Navy later changed its plan and opted for a fully equipped flight deck with the ski-jump ramp in front, after deciding to purchase F-35B STOVL aircraft. Turkey was a Level 3 partner in the Joint Strike Fighter program that led to the F-35 Lightning II, and the Turkish Air Force was intending to get the F-35A CTOL version until the U.S. Senate blocked the export of the fighter jet to Turkey due to its purchase of the S-400 missile system from Russia, which is subjected to CAATSA sanctions. Instead of the F-35B STOVL version, in the short term the Turkish Navy will operate domestically-produced UCAVs such as the Bayraktar TB3. 

According to the official specifications, TCG Anadolu will be capable of operating up to 10 F-35Bs (if Turkey will purchase the aircraft in the future) and 12 medium-sized helicopters in the "V/STOL aircraft carrier" configuration. 

Its displacement will be 24,660 tons in "V/STOL aircraft carrier" mission configuration; or 27,079 tons in "amphibious assault ship" mission configuration. Its maximum range will be  at economical speed.

V/STOL aircraft carrier configuration
The ship has a  flight deck and a  aviation hangar which can accommodate either 12 medium-sized helicopters or 8 Boeing CH-47F Chinook heavy-lift helicopters. When the aviation hangar and the light cargo garage are unified, the ship can carry up to 25 medium-sized helicopters. Alternatively, the ship can carry up to 10 F-35B STOVL fighter jets and 12 medium-sized helicopters, with the possibility of hosting six more helicopters on the flight deck of the ship.

Amphibious assault ship configuration
The ship has a  light cargo garage for TEU containers and 27 Amphibious Assault Vehicles (AAV); a  dock which can host four Landing Craft Mechanized (LCM) or two Landing Craft Air Cushion (LCAC), or two Landing Craft Vehicle Personnel (LCVP); and a  garage for heavy loads, which can host 29 main battle tanks (MBT), Amphibious Assault Vehicles, and TEU containers. The ship will be protected by the ARAS-2023 diver detection sonar (DDS), and will have a crew consisting of 261 personnel: 30 officers, 49 NCOs, 59 leading seamen, and 123 ratings.

Construction

The final contract for the construction of the ship was signed with the Navantia-Sedef consortium on 7 May 2015. The commissioning of the ship was scheduled for 2021, and the estimated cost of the ship according to the final specifications was declared as $1 billion in 2015. The construction works began on 30 April 2016 at the shipyard of Sedef Shipbuilding Inc. in Istanbul.

A small area in the forward of the ship caught fire whilst in dry dock on the evening of 29 April 2019, but the fire was quickly extinguished and the minor damage on the coating paint (stains of smoke and flames) was subsequently repaired with a fresh repainting. On 27 February 2022, TCG Anadolu has officially started sea trials.

TCG Trakya
The construction of a sister ship, to be named TCG Trakya, is being planned by the Turkish Navy. Trakya means Thrace in Turkish.

See also
 Spanish amphibious assault ship Juan Carlos I

References

2019 ships
Amphibious warfare vessels of the Turkish Navy
Ships built at Sedef Shipyard